The Pursuit is the fifth studio album by Jamie Cullum. It was released on 9 November 2009 in the United Kingdom, and released in the United States and Canada on 2 March 2010. It was produced by Greg Wells and Martin Terefe, and mixed by Greg Wells, Thomas Juth and Ryan Hewitt. The album's title is taken from the novel The Pursuit of Love by Nancy Mitford. The album was recorded at a Los Angeles studio using songs that Cullum originally recorded at his Shepherd's Bush recording studio, Terrified Studios. The song "Mixtape" features Sophie Dahl on backing vocals.

The first single from the album, "I'm All Over It", was released on 2 November 2009.

Music Week critic Andy Morris states in his review of the album, "The Cole Porter cover at the start won't surprise you, but the house track at the end just might. Cullum's fifth album does justice to his musical influences: from the Portishead-tinged 'If I Ruled The World' to the wonky groove of 'We Run Things', it's bold, experimental and the best thing Cullum's done."

Both the track listing and the cover-art for the album were released on 27 August 2009, art directed by Sacha (Spencer Trace) Teulon.

Track listing

Charts and certifications

Weekly charts

Year-end charts

Certifications and sales

!scope="row"|Worldwide
|
|700,000 
|-

Release history

References

2009 albums
Jamie Cullum albums
Crossover jazz albums
Jazz-pop albums